Edmonton/Lechelt Field Aerodrome  is a private aerodrome located  east of Edmonton, Alberta, Canada.

See also
List of airports in the Edmonton Metropolitan Region

References

Page about this airport on COPA's Places to Fly airport directory

Registered aerodromes in Alberta
Aviation in Edmonton
Transport in Strathcona County